Ramah Navajo School Board, Inc. v. Bureau of Revenue of New Mexico, 458 U.S. 832 (1982), is a United States Supreme Court case in which the Court held that the state was not authorized to impose taxes on a construction company building a school on a Native American (Indian) reservation.

The board operates Pine Hill Schools.

Background 
The children of Ramah Navajo Chapter of the Navajo Nation in New Mexico attended a public high school that was near the Navajo Reservation until the state closed the school in 1968.  No other public schools were nearby, and children either did not attend high school or had to go to a federal Indian boarding school, none of which were close to the reservation.  The New Mexico Taxation and Revenue Department assessed taxes on the construction company who built the school.

See also 
 Mescalero Apache Tribe v. Jones (1973)
 List of United States Supreme Court cases, volume 458

References

External links
 

1982 in United States case law
United States Supreme Court cases
United States Supreme Court cases of the Burger Court
United States Native American tax case law
Legal history of New Mexico
Navajo history
Education on the Navajo Nation
Ramah Navajo Indian Reservation